Federico Sansonetti Anker (born 6 November 1986) is a Uruguayan professional tennis player.

ATP Tournaments Finals

Runner-Up (2)

References

External links
 
 
 

Uruguayan male tennis players
Living people
Sportspeople from Montevideo
1986 births
Tennis players at the 2011 Pan American Games
Pan American Games competitors for Uruguay
Tennis players at the 2007 Pan American Games